Hugh Allen was an Anglican bishop in the second half of the sixteenth century.

An Englishman, he was appointed Bishop of Down and Connor on 21 November 1573; and translated to Ferns on 24 May 1582. He died at Fethard in 1599.

References

16th-century Anglican bishops in Ireland
Bishops of Down and Connor
Bishops of Ferns
Bishops of Ferns and Leighlin
1572 deaths
16th-century Anglo-Irish people